Serviço Social da Indústria-SP Volei Feminino (SESI-SP) is a Brazilian women's volleyball club founded on 2011 based in São Paulo, Brazil and plays in the Brazilian Superliga.

History
Created by SESI-SP President Paulo Skaf in 2011 as one of the newest teams in Brazil. Their achievements include two championships in São Paulo Cup.

They won the 14th edition of the South American Volleyball Club Championship women's edition in February 2014 to qualify for the 8th edition of the FIVB Women's Volleyball Club World Championship which was held in Zurich, Switzerland on May 7 to 11, 2014.

Team roster

2016–2017 team
Head coach:  Giuliano Ribas

Technical and managerial staff

Honors
FIVB Club World Championship
Third Place (1): 2014
Women's South American Volleyball Club Championship
Champions (1): 2014
Superliga
Runner-Up (1): 2014
Fourth (1): 2013
Fifth (1): 2012
São Paulo Volleyball Cup
Champion (1): 2012

See also
 Serviço Social da Indústria-SP (men's volleyball)

References

Brazilian volleyball clubs
Volleyball clubs established in 2011
Volleyball clubs in São Paulo (state)
Sports teams in São Paulo